Yoon Jong-shin (born October 15, 1969) is a South Korean singer-songwriter, record producer, and the CEO of Mystic Story.

Early life and education
Yoon completed high school at Daewon Foreign Language High School and studied Korean Language and Literature at Yonsei University, graduating in 1993. He joined a music club called Sochangsa (소창사) where he nurtured his love for music.

Career
In 1990, he made his debut as a guest singer for 015B.

In 1991, he announced his first album Like the first time we met (처음 만날 때처럼) as a solo singer which drew huge public interest. He has continuously collaborated with 015B since.

In 2000, he made his movie debut in Can hardly stop them with a cameo along with the director, Kim. He became active in the field of entertainment and, in 2003, took a role in a sitcom Nonstop 4 where he played a professor.

He owns a talent agency/record label called Mystic89, founded in 2001 with Lee Hak-hee.

In 2009, he became a regular cast member in Radio Star, the main segment of MBC's Golden Fishery, and in SBS's Family Outing. He has also been a judge for seasons 1–3 and 5–7 of Mnet's talent show Superstar K.
 
In February 2012, he made an appearance on SBS's Healing Camp, Aren't You Happy where he announced that he had Crohn's disease which is an incurable inflammatory bowel disease. He became the co-host of SBS's GO Show in April 2012.

In February 2013, he became the co-host of SBS's Hwasin - Controller of the Heart.

From April 2013, he is the regular host of SBS reality show, Barefooted Friends.

In 2017, Red Velvet released a remake of his 1996 song "Rebirth" (환생) through SM Station.

In 2019, he was a judge in the JTBC talent show Superband.

In 2021, he will become the main host of Mysterious Record Shop.'' The other co-host will be Wendy, Kyuhyun, and Jang Yoon Jung.

Personal life
Yoon married former professional tennis player Jeon Mi-ra in 2006. They have three children Yoon Ra-ik, Yoon Ra-im and Yoon Ra-oh together. In July 2020, Yoon rushed back to Korea to tend to his ill mother, and she passed in September of that year.

Discography

Studio albums

Charted songs

Filmography

Television shows

Web shows

Movie 
2007 "Project Makeover" (Movie) Mr.Yoon

Awards and nominations

References

External links
 

1969 births
K-pop singers
Living people
South Korean composers
South Korean male singers
South Korean pop singers
South Korean songwriters
South Korean record producers
Melon Music Award winners
Mystic Entertainment artists
People with Crohn's disease
South Korean Presbyterians